Ceriomicrodon is a genus of hoverflies. The only known species, Ceriomicrodon petiolatus, lives in the Brazilian states Mato Grosso, Roraima, Amazonas, Maranhão and Rondônia. Its biology is poorly known, but the larvae are assumed to live in ant nests. Only a few specimens were known of the species until 2014, when the species was redescribed.

References

Diptera of South America
Hoverfly genera
Monotypic Diptera genera
Microdontinae